CRL-40,940 (also known as flmodafinil, bisfluoromodafinil and lauflumide) is the bisfluoro analog of modafinil. It is a eugeroic as well as a weak dopamine reuptake inhibitor. Its inventors claim that it is more effective than modafinil and adrafinil, with fewer side effects. It was patented in 2013, and pre-clinical trials have been underway since December 2015.

See also 
 Adrafinil
 Armodafinil
 CE-123
 CRL-40,941
 Fluorenol

References 

Acetamides
Designer drugs
Dopamine reuptake inhibitors
Drugs with unknown mechanisms of action
Fluoroarenes
Nootropics
Stimulants
Sulfoxides